Juan Bautista (born in Mexico, 1555; date of death unknown, but probably between 1606 and 1615) was a Mexican Franciscan theologian and writer.

Life

He joined the Franciscans in his native city, and taught theology and metaphysics at the convent of St. Francis of Mexico. He was also a definitor of the province, and became Guardian of Tezcuco twice (1595 and 1606), of Tlatelolco (1600), and of Tacuba in 1605.

Works

A number of his works are known by title only. Ten of these were written in the Nahuatl language, previous to 1607; several were printed at Mexico. He learned Nahuatl after joining the Franciscans.

References

Attribution
 The entry cites:
Mendieta, Historia eclesiastica Indiana (finished in 1599 but first published by Yeazbalceta, Mexico, 1870);
Juan de Torquemada, Los veinte y uno Libros Rituales y Monarchia Indiana con el origen y guerras de los Indios occidentales (first ed., Madrid, 1613; 2d ed., ibid., 1725);
Pinelo, Epitome (2d ed., Madrid, 1737–58);
Nicolas Antonio, Biblioteca Hispana nova (Madrid, 1766), II;
Joaquin Garcia Ycazbalceta, Bibliografia mexicana del Siglo XVI (Mexico, 1886).

1555 births
Mexican Franciscans
Mexican theologians
Year of death unknown
Mexican male writers